Rama Vaidyanathan is an Indian bharatnatyam artist from Delhi.

She is one of the directors of Ganesha Natyalaya, one of the best Bharatanatyam institutes of the country. She has toured the country and the world, performing and showcasing her art.

She is married to C. V. Kamesh, CXO at Hitachi India, and son of Saroja Vaidyanathan.

Rama Vaidyanathan received the Kerala Sangeetha Nataka Akademi Award in 2013, and the Sangeet Natak Akademi Award in 2017.

References

1960s births
Bharatanatyam exponents
Dancers from Delhi
Indian female classical dancers
Living people
Recipients of the Sangeet Natak Akademi Award
Recipients of the Kerala Sangeetha Nataka Akademi Award